Lye railway station serves the Lye area of Stourbridge, in the West Midlands of England.  The station is managed by West Midlands Trains, who provide the majority of train services; Chiltern Railways also operate a small number of trains.  It is situated on the Birmingham-Stourbridge line.

History
Lye station was opened in 1863 by the Stourbridge Railway, on their line from Stourbridge Junction to Old Hill.  This was later taken over by the Great Western Railway, who incorporated it into their line to Birmingham.

Lye railway station has the joint-shortest name (Lye) in the United Kingdom.

The ticket office is no longer open, however there are ticket machines on the station platform.

Services
Trains run alternately via  and via , though the latter service is curtailed at Dorridge in the evenings. On Sundays, trains are hourly.

There are additional services at peak times, including occasional Chiltern Railways services to London Marylebone.

References

Further reading

External links

Rail Around Birmingham and the West Midlands: Lye station

Railway stations in Dudley
DfT Category E stations
Former Great Western Railway stations
Railway stations in Great Britain opened in 1863
Railway stations served by Chiltern Railways
Railway stations served by West Midlands Trains